Richa Sharma (6 August 1964  10 December 1996), also known by her married name Richa Sharma Dutt, was an Indian actress and model who worked in Bollywood. She married Sanjay Dutt in 1987 and died of a brain tumour in 1996.

Career 
Sharma had approached Dev Anand at a film shoot wanting to be cast as his next heroine but was too young. Dev promised her that he would cast her once she grew older, he then eventually gave her a break with Hum Naujawan in 1985. She next went on to act in Anubhav and Insaaf Ki Awaaz the following year and in Sadak Chhap and Aag Hi Aag in 1987.

Filmography

Personal life and death 
Sharma married bollywood actor, Sanjay Dutt in New York City, United States in 1987. The couple had a daughter, Trishala Dutt. Within two years of marriage, she was diagnosed with a brain tumour. Sharma died at her parent's home in New York on 10 December 1996.

References

1964 births
1996 deaths
20th-century Indian actresses
Indian film actresses